Reno is a census-designated place in southern Marietta Township, Washington County, Ohio, United States.  It has a post office with the ZIP code 45773.  It is located on the Ohio River a short distance below the county seat of Marietta.  State Route 7 forms its main street.

History
Reno was originally called Jericho; the present name, honoring United States Army officer Jesse L. Reno, was adopted when at the time the post office was established. A post office called Reno has been in operation since 1887.

References

See also
List of cities and towns along the Ohio River

Unincorporated communities in Washington County, Ohio
Ohio populated places on the Ohio River
Unincorporated communities in Ohio